The king mackerel (Scomberomorus cavalla) or kingfish, is a migratory species of mackerel of the western Atlantic Ocean and Gulf of Mexico. It is an important species to both the commercial and recreational fishing industries.

Description
The entire body is covered with very small, hardly visible, loosely attached scales. The first (spiny) dorsal fin is entirely colorless and is normally folded back into a body groove, as are the pelvic fins. The lateral line starts high on the shoulder, dips abruptly at mid-body and then continues as a wavy horizontal line to the tail. Coloration is olive on the back, fading to silver with a rosy iridescence on the sides, fading to white on the belly. Fish under  show yellowish-brown spots on the flanks, somewhat smaller than the spots of the Atlantic Spanish mackerel, Scomberomorus maculatus. Its cutting-edged teeth are large, uniform, closely spaced and flattened from side to side. These teeth look very similar to those of the bluefish, Pomatomus saltatrix.

Distribution and habitat
The king mackerel is a subtropical species of the Atlantic Coast of the Americas. Common in the coastal zone from North Carolina to Brazil, it occurs as far south as Rio de Janeiro, and occasionally as far north as the Gulf of Maine and also found in Eastern coast of India, in the Bay of Bengal, Indian Ocean and Western coast of India in the Arabian Sea. Nonetheless, a preference for water temperatures in the range of  may limit distribution.

Larger kings (heavier than 9 kg or 20 lb) often occur inshore, in the mouths of inlets and harbors, and occasionally even at the  depths at the edge of the Gulf Stream.

Migration patterns

At least two migratory groups of king mackerel have been found to exist off the American coast.  A Gulf of Mexico group ranges from the Texas coast in summer to the middle-east coast of Florida from November through March. Spawning occurs throughout the summer off the northern Gulf Coast.

An Atlantic group is abundant off North Carolina in spring and fall. This group migrates to southeast Florida, where it spawns from May through August, and slowly returns through summer. Apparently, this group winters in deep water off the Carolinas, as tagging studies have shown they are never found off Florida in winter.

Life history
Eggs and sperm are shed into the sea and their union is by chance. Depending on size, a female may shed from 50,000 to several million eggs over the spawning season. Fertilized eggs hatch in about 24 hours. Little is known about king mackerel in their first year of life. At age seven, females average , males .

Feeding habits
King mackerel are voracious, opportunistic carnivores. Their prey depends on their size. Depending on area and season, they favor squid, menhaden and other sardine-like fish (Clupeidae), jacks (Carangidae), cutlassfish (Trichiuridae), weakfish (Sciaenidae), grunts (Haemulidae), striped anchovies (Engraulidae), cigar minnows, threadfin, northern mackerel, and blue runners.  They do not attack humans but will defend themselves against perceived threats, including humans flailing or thrashing in man-overboard and similar situations, by biting.

Fisheries

Fishing gear and methods
King mackerel are among the most sought-after gamefish throughout their range from North Carolina to Texas. Known throughout the sportfishing world for their blistering runs, the king mackerel matches its distant relative, the wahoo, in speed.
They are taken mostly by trolling, using various live and dead baitfish, spoons, jigs and other artificial lures. Commercial gear consists of run-around gill nets. They are also taken commercially by trolling with large planers, heavy tackle and lures similar to those used by sport fishers. Typically when using live bait, two hooks are tied to a strong metal leader. The first may be a treble or single and is hooked through the live bait's nose and/or mouth. The second hook (treble hook) is placed through the top of the fish's back or allowed to swing free. This must be done because king mackerel commonly bite the tail section of a bait fish. When trolling for kings using this method, it is important to make sure the baitfish are swimming properly.

Several organizations have found success in promoting tournament events for this species because of their popularity as a sport fish.  The most notable are the Southern Kingfish Association (SKA) and the FLW Outdoors tour. These events are covered in several outdoors publications, both in print and online.

As food

Processing
As of 2005, king mackerel are primarily marketed fresh. They may be sold as fillets, steaks, or in the round (whole). Their raw flesh is grayish, due to its high fat content. They are best prepared by grilling, frying, baking or, especially for large "smoker" king, by smoking.

Nutrition

According to the United States Food and Drug Administration, king mackerel is one of four fishes, along with swordfish, shark, and tilefish, that children and pregnant women should avoid due to high levels of methylmercury found in these fish and the consequent risk of mercury poisoning.

Similar species
Small king mackerel are similar in appearance to Atlantic Spanish mackerel, Scomberomorus maculatus, and cero mackerel, Scomberomorus regalis, all three species being similar in shape and coloration. They may be distinguished as follows:

The lateral line on Atlantic Spanish mackerel and cero slopes gradually from the top edge of the gill to the tail. In contrast, that of the king mackerel takes an abrupt drop at mid-body (see illustration).

The first (spiny) dorsal fin on Atlantic Spanish mackerel and cero has a prominent black patch. The king mackerel does not. As all three species normally keep the first dorsal folded back in a body groove, this difference is not immediately evident.

Atlantic Spanish mackerel have prominent yellow spots on the flanks at all sizes. In addition to such spots, cero have one or more yellow stripes along the centerline.

Worldwide, many fish of these three species are quite similar to one or another. Off Mexico, Atlantic Spanish mackerel may be confused with Serra Spanish mackerel, Scomberomorus brasiliensis.

Notes

References
 
 
 King mackerel  NOAA FishWatch. Retrieved 11 November 2012.
Collette, B., et al. 2011. Scomberomorus cavalla. In: IUCN 2012. IUCN Red List of Threatened Species. Version 2012.2. Downloaded on 7 June 2013.

king mackerel
Commercial fish
Sport fish
Fish of the Western Atlantic
king mackerel
king mackerel